The Albert Bridge is a road bridge that spans the River Clyde in Glasgow, Scotland, near Glasgow Green. The bridge opened in 1871. It links the Saltmarket in the city centre with Crown Street on the city’s south side. It is category A listed, and named after Queen Victoria's consort, Prince Albert.

Previous bridges 

Albert Bridge is the fifth bridge to be built on the site in Glasgow. The first, built in 1794 and destroyed by flooding in 1795, was known as Hutcheson Bridge. The second, built in 1803, was a timber footbridge. The third, replacing the second in 1834, was a masonry arch bridge, designed by Robert Stevenson (grandfather to the author Robert Louis Stevenson).

Stevenson’s bridge was demolished in 1868, and replaced with the fourth, a temporary wooden bridge. In 1871, that one in turn was replaced by the fifth: the Albert Bridge, which still stands today.

Construction

Construction of the Albert Bridge was managed by a group of trustees, who examined the condition of the previous bridge and decided it should be completely removed, and replaced with one that would be more elegant and convenient. They initially agreed on a budget of £39,000, and engaged the Glasgow firm of Bell & Miller Engineers to design the bridge. However, the design Bell & Miller came up with turned out to be too costly to build: When the trustees solicited bids from builders, the lowest they received was £54,000. So they asked Bell & Miller to revise their design. After some of the design’s structural features were changed, they received a bid of £48,000 from the builders Hanna, Donald & Wilson of Paisley, Scotland, which they accepted.

Albert Bridge is founded on concrete piers and abutments, filled with cast iron caissons, that are sunk about 86 ft below water level. The designers rejected traditional masonry was rejected in favour of rivetted wrought iron elliptical arches. The largest of the arches spans 114 ft. The arch ribs are masked by cast iron spandrels adorned with the Royal coat of arms, the coat of arms of Prince Albert and the coats of arms of various corporate bodies. The stone pillars that support the parapet are decorated with medallions depicting Queen Victoria and Prince Albert that were made by the Scottish sculptor George Edwin Ewing.

The bridge carries a two-way, two-lane highway (the eastern branch of the A8 Highway) across the River Clyde. It is supplemented by the Victoria Bridge, which is on the other side of the nearby railway bridge , and carries a one-way road, northbound, across the river.

A £3.4 million refurbishment programme was launched in 2015, and given Royal recognition by a visit from the Earl of Wessex on 13 October 2016.

References

Notes 

Bridges completed in 1871
Bridges in Glasgow
Bridges across the River Clyde
Category A listed buildings in Glasgow
Gorbals
Glasgow Green
1871 establishments in Scotland